Esmiraldo Sá da Silva (born 20 September 1997), known professionally as Jardel, is a Bissau-Guinean footballer who plays as a forward for Portuguese club CD Feirense and the Guinea-Bissau national team.

Career
Jardel started his career with Spanish third tier side Deportivo Fabril. In 2020, he signed for Leça in the Portuguese third tier. In 2021, Jardel signed for Portuguese second tier club Feirense. On 21 August 2022, he went viral on the internet after scoring a penalty with an unusual run-up and then missing a 90th minute penalty  using the same run-up during a 1–1 draw with Leixões.

References

External links
 

1997 births
Living people
Bissau-Guinean emigrants to Portugal
Naturalised citizens of Portugal
Portuguese people of Bissau-Guinean descent
Bissau-Guinean footballers
Portuguese footballers
Association football forwards
Deportivo Fabril players
Real Valladolid Promesas players
Algeciras CF footballers
Mérida AD players
Leça F.C. players
C.D. Feirense players
Liga Portugal 2 players
Segunda División B players
Portugal youth international footballers
Guinea-Bissau international footballers
Bissau-Guinean expatriate footballers
Portuguese expatriate footballers
Bissau-Guinean expatriate sportspeople in Spain
Portuguese expatriate sportspeople in Spain
Expatriate footballers in Spain